Shri Krishna AYUSH University is a university established by Haryana Government by act no. 25 of 2017. It started functioning from academic year 2018-19 and has headquarters in Sector 8, Kurukshetra city of Haryana, India. Current Vice Chancellor of Shri Krishna Ayush University is Dr. Baldev Singh Dhiman. Shri Krishna Ayush University is first university of its kind in the world which offers all the AYUSH courses.

Courses 
BAMS (Bachelor in Ayurvedic Medicine & Surgery)

BHMS (Bachelor in Homeopathic Medicine & Surgery)

BYMS (Bachelor in Yoga Medicine & Surgery)

BUMS (Bachelor in Unani Medicine & Surgery)

BSMS (Bachelor in Siddha Medicine & Surgery)

D.Pharmacy (Diploma in Ayurvedic Pharmacy)

Panchkarma Certificate Course (One Year)

References

External links
Official website

Universities and colleges in Haryana